This is a list of fried chicken dishes. Chicken is the most common type of poultry in the world, and was one of the first domesticated animals. Chicken is a major worldwide source of meat for human consumption, and is prepared as food in a wide variety of ways.

One common method of preparing chicken is frying, or cooking of food in oil or another fat.  Fried chicken dishes include preparations that are deep fried, such as the ubiquitous fried chicken that originated in the Southern United States, shallow fried, pan fried, stir fried or sautéed.

Fried chicken dishes

See also

 Fried chicken restaurant
 List of chicken dishes
 List of deep fried foods
 List of fast-food chicken restaurants

References

External links
 

 
Chicken, Fried
Chicken, Fried